Ethel M. Cochrane (born September 23, 1937) is a former Canadian Senator having represented the province of Newfoundland and Labrador from 1986 until 2012.

A teacher by training, Cochrane worked as an educator in her native Newfoundland culminating in her period as a school principal. An advocate for education and literacy, she was appointed to the Senate by Governor General Jeanne Sauvé, on the recommendation of Prime Minister Brian Mulroney, in November 1986. She sat as a Progressive Conservative senator until February 2004 when she and most other PC Senators joined the new Conservative Party of Canada. Cochrane is the first female senator to represent Newfoundland and Labrador. She retired in 2012 when she reached the mandatory retirement age of 75. She is a past member of the Girl Guides of Canada.

Senator Cochrane now resides in Port Au Port East with her husband Jim.

References
 

1937 births
Living people
Canadian senators from Newfoundland and Labrador
Progressive Conservative Party of Canada senators
Conservative Party of Canada senators
Women members of the Senate of Canada
Women in Newfoundland and Labrador politics
21st-century Canadian politicians
21st-century Canadian women politicians